George D. Hart (December 7, 1846 – February 24, 1932) was a Massachusetts politician who served as a Massachusetts State Senator and as a member of the Common Council, and as the 21st Mayor of Lynn, Massachusetts.

Notes

Mayors of Lynn, Massachusetts
1846 births
Massachusetts city council members
Massachusetts state senators
People of Massachusetts in the American Civil War
1932 deaths